The 2006 Big East Men's Basketball Championship was played from March 8 to March 11, 2006.  The tournament took place at Madison Square Garden in New York City. It was a single-elimination tournament with four rounds.  Villanova and Connecticut tied for the best regular season conference record.  Based on tie-breakers, Connecticut was awarded the #1 seed.
The Syracuse Orange won the tournament for the second consecutive season and fifth time overall, and were awarded an automatic bid to the 2006 NCAA Men's Division I Basketball Tournament.  As a 9-seed, the Orange are the lowest seeded team to win the Big East tournament, and became the first school to win four games in the tournament.  Gerry McNamara of Syracuse was given the Dave Gavitt Trophy, awarded to the tournament's most outstanding player.

Syracuse's Run

This tournament is best remembered for Syracuse's improbable run to the championship as a #9 seed, with McNamara pulling off excellent 3-point shooting and some improbable buzzer beaters and last-second shots to lead them. In the first game, after Devan Downey of Cincinnati stole the inbounds pass with ten seconds left and was fouled, he made one of two to put the Bearcats up two points. However, with just a half second left, McNamara made a running one-handed three-pointer to secure the victory, 74–73.

After jumping out to a big lead against Connecticut in the second game, Uconn battled back for much of the game until they finally took their first lead of the game with 30 seconds to play. Incredibly, McNamara was the hero for Syracuse again, hitting a 30-foot three-pointer with 5 seconds left to send the game into overtime. The Orange went on to win 86–84, holding off the Huskies on a last-second effort. McNamara finished with thirteen assists, ten in the first half alone.

They faced Georgetown in the semifinals in their attempt to become the first team to win the Big East tournament as one of the teams forced to play on the first day, requiring four wins in a row. The Hoyas went up early, holding a fifteen-point lead at the half. McNamara sat out for ten minutes because of a nagging groin injury. Surprising everyone, McNamara came out in the second half and drained five three-pointers, including one with 45 seconds left and the Orange down four. Demetris Nichols knocked away the inbounds pass for Georgetown, allowing McNamara to take possession and rush down the floor with time running out. He passed to an open Eric Devendorf who laid the winning shot in with 1.5 seconds to go. The Orange had advanced to the finals, beating Georgetown, 58–57.

After improbably winning three straight games either in overtime or by one point, they got a slightly easier win in the finals against Pittsburgh, winning 65–61. The Orange led most of the game, but midway through the second half, the Panthers had taken the lead. McNamara quickly made a three-point shot after that and Josh Wright made four clutch free throws in the final minute to secure the historic championship. Syracuse had finished just 7–9 in the Big East that year, and would have likely been left out of the NCAA tournament had they not pulled off at least two of the four wins. They would go on to lose to Texas A&M in the first round of the tournament.

Bracket

* – Overtime

Note: By finishing below twelfth place during the regular season, DePaul, Providence, St. John's, and South Florida did not qualify for the tournament.

Games
1st round:  Wednesday, March 8
Noon

2PM

7PM

9PM

Quarterfinals:  Thursday, March 9
Noon

2 PM

7 PM

9 PM

Semifinals:  Friday, March 10
7 PM

9 PM

Finals:  Saturday, March 11
8 PM

Awards
Dave Gavitt Trophy (Most Outstanding Player): Gerry McNamara, Syracuse

All-Tournament Team
Aaron Gray, Pittsburgh
Carl Krauser, Pittsburgh
Demetris Nichols, Syracuse
Darryl Watkins, Syracuse
Randy Foye, Villanova

References

Tournament
Big East men's basketball tournament
Basketball in New York City
College sports in New York City
Sports competitions in New York City
Sports in Manhattan
Big East men's basketball tournament
Big East men's basketball tournament
2000s in Manhattan
Madison Square Garden